Estadio Ciudad de Caseros is a football stadium in Caseros, Buenos Aires, Argentina.  It is the home ground of Club Atlético Estudiantes.  The stadium holds 16,740 people and was opened on 11 May 1963.

References

External links
 Estadio Ciudad de Caseros

Ciudad de Caseros
Ciudad de Caseros
Estudiantes de Buenos Aires